Arne Gunerius Aas (1890–1953) was a Norwegian civil servant and politician. He worked as a prosecutor in Tromsø from 1914 to 1916 and then held the same job in Tønsberg from 1916 to 1918. He worked as a private lawyer starting in 1918. He was elected to the city council of Tønsberg in 1927 and then he held the position of mayor of Tønsberg from 1935 to 1936. After World War II, he was appointed to be one of the war judges. Then, in 1946, he was appointed to be the County Governor of Troms county, a position he held until his death in 1953.

References

1890 births
1953 deaths
County governors of Norway